Moradabad Mayoral Constituency is one of the 16 mayoral constituency in Uttar Pradesh.

Total Number of Voters

List of Mayors

*By Election

Election Results

References

Moradabad
People from Moradabad
Politicians from Moradabad